A Dún Laoghaire–Rathdown County Council election was held in Ireland on 23 May 2014 as part of that year's local elections. Forty councillors were elected from a field of 85 candidates for a five-year term of office from six local electoral areas by proportional representation with a single transferable vote.

Again mirroring trends in Dublin the number of councillors was expanded from 28 to 40 between 2009 and 2014. Fine Gael retained their position as the leading party on the authority with 11 seats, including 2 seats in each of Blackrock, Dundrum and Stillorgan and 3 seats in Dún Laoghaire. Fianna Fáil doubled their seats to 8 and won 2 seats in each of Blackrock and Stillorgan. Labour lost 1 seat overall to emerge with 7 seats. The party won 2 seats in each of Glencullen-Sandyford and Killiney-Shankill to compensate from losing a seat in Dún Laoghaire. Sinn Féin gained 3 seats to secure representation on the Council for the first time. People Before Profit gained 2 extra seats to also return with 3 councillors. The Green Party also returned with 2 seats with 2 gains in Dundrum and Dún Laoghaire. Independents doubled their seats to return with 6 seats to the Council chamber.

Results by party

Results by Electoral Area

Blackrock

Dundrum

Dún Laoghaire

Glencullen-Sandyford

Killiney-Shankill

Stillorgan

References

Post-Election Changes
†Dundrum Green Party Cllr Catherine Martin was elected as a TD for Dublin Rathdown at the Irish general election, 2016. Karen Furlong was co-opted to fill the vacancy on 14 March 2016. She resigned her seat in September 2018 and Daniel Dunne was co-opted to fill the vacancy on 8 October 2018.
††Killiney-Shankill Fine Gael Cllr Maria Bailey was elected as a TD for Dún Laoghaire at the Irish general election, 2016. Jim Gildea was co-opted to fill the vacancy on 14 March 2016.
†††Stillorgan Fine Gael Cllr Josepha Madigan was elected as a TD for Dublin Rathdown at the Irish general election, 2016. John Kennedy was co-opted to fill the vacancy on 14 March 2016.
††††Blackrock Independent Cllr Victor Boyhan was elected to Seanad Éireann in April 2016. Anne Colgan was co-opted to fill the vacancy.
†††††Glencullen-Sandyford Fine Gael Cllr Neale Richmond was elected to Seanad Éireann in April 2016. Emma Blain was co-opted to fill the vacancy.
††††††Stillorgan Fianna Fáil Cllr Gerry Horkan was elected to Seanad Éireann in April 2016. Donal Smith was co-opted to fill the vacancy.
†††††††Stillorgan Labour Cllr Richard Humphreys was appointed a High Court Judge in July 2015 and resigned his council seat in May 2015. Carron McKinney was co-opted to fill the vacancy in May 2015. She resigned her seat due to increased work commitments in the UK on May 8, 2017. In June 2017 Alex White was co-opted to fill the vacancy.
††††††††Dún Laoghaire People Before Profit Alliance Cllr Karl Gill resigned his seat for personal reasons in October 2016. Dave O'Keeffe was co-opted to fill the vacancy on 10 October 2016.
††††††††Glencullen-Sandyford Independent Cllr Lynsey McGovern joined Fine Gael on 25 October 2017.
†††††††††Dundrum Fine Gael Cllr Brian Murphy lost the party whip on 31 October 2017 following comments he made on social media regarding sharia law, islam and the need for increased border security.

External links 
 Official website

2014
2014